Arietoceltites is an extinct genus of cephalopod belonging to the ammonite subclass.

References 

Tropitidae
Ceratitida genera